Penteleium or Penteleion was a fortress in the north of ancient Arcadia near Pheneus, situated upon a mountain of the same name. Its site is unlocated.

References

Populated places in ancient Arcadia
Former populated places in Greece
Lost ancient cities and towns